This is a list of record labels based in Chicago.

References

Companies based in Chicago
Chicago-related lists